Alexia Dechaume-Balleret (born 3 May 1970) is a former professional tennis player from France.

In her career, she reached three finals on the WTA Tour: at Taranto in 1990, she lost to Raffaella Reggi, and in New York in 1991, she lost to Brenda Schultz-McCarthy at Schenectady, both Tier V tournaments. At the Tier IV event in Cardiff in 1997, she lost to Virginia Ruano Pascual in the final, in three sets.

Her best Grand Slam performance was the fourth round at the 1994 French Open. As a wildcard entrant and the world No. 197, she beat Emanuela Zardo, Wiltrud Probst and Marzia Grossi, then lost to third seed Conchita Martínez, 1–6, 2–6.

She achieved more notable success in doubles, winning six titles, four with Florencia Labat, and ranking as high as No. 22 in the WTA rankings. On 17 August 1992, she reached her career-high singles ranking of world No. 46.

She retired after a first-round defeat at the hands of Emmanuelle Gagliardi, at the 2000 Australian Open.

On 16 December 2008, Alexia Dechaume was named coach of the French Fed Cup team by the French Tennis Federation.

Dechaume-Balleret is married to Bernard Balleret.

WTA career finals

Singles: 3 (3 runner-ups)

Doubles: 11 (6 titles, 5 runner-ups)

ITF Circuit finals

Singles: 2 (1–1)

Doubles: 1 (1–0)

Head-to-head records against other players in the top 10
 Lindsay Davenport 0–1
 Dominique Monami 0–1
 Arantxa Sánchez Vicario 0–1
 Serena Williams 1–0
 Anna Kournikova 0–2
 Karina Habšudová 1–0
 Steffi Graf 0–2
 Amélie Mauresmo 1–1
 Martina Navratilova 0–3
 Jana Novotná 0–3
 Iva Majoli 0–1
 Venus Williams 0–2

References

External links
 
 

1970 births
Living people
French female tennis players
French Open junior champions
Grand Slam (tennis) champions in girls' doubles